Tachiramantis cuentasi  is a species of frog in the family Strabomantidae.

It is found in Colombia and possibly Venezuela.
It is threatened by habitat loss.

References

Endemic fauna of Colombia
Amphibians of Colombia
Amphibians of the Andes
Frogs of South America
Amphibians described in 2003
Taxonomy articles created by Polbot